Anthony Joseph Melio (May 13, 1932 – July 19, 2012) was a Democratic member of the Pennsylvania House of Representatives for the 141st District.

Early life and education
Melio was born in Trenton, New Jersey and attended Trenton Central High School. He served in the United States Navy Reserves from 1949 to 1959.

Legislative career
Melio was elected to the Pennsylvania House of Representatives in 1986. He retired at the end of the legislative session on November 30, 2010.

Illness and death
Melio died in Philadelphia, Pennsylvania at the age of eighty on July 19, 2012 from complications related to an appendectomy.

References

External links
Pennsylvania House of Representatives profile
Official website

1932 births
2012 deaths
Democratic Party members of the Pennsylvania House of Representatives
People from Bucks County, Pennsylvania
Politicians from Trenton, New Jersey
Trenton Central High School alumni
United States Navy sailors
United States Navy reservists